Back to Basics is the fifth studio album by American singer Christina Aguilera. It was released on August 9, 2006, in the United States through RCA Records as a double album. Serving as executive producer, she enlisted a wide range of producers, including DJ Premier, Rich Harrison, Rob Lewis, Mark Ronson, and Linda Perry. Recording sessions took place between 2005 and 2006 at several studios in the United States and the United Kingdom.

Inspired by Aguilera's 1920s–1950s idols, including Billie Holiday, Otis Redding, Etta James, and Ella Fitzgerald, Back to Basics was described by Aguilera herself as a fusion of old-school jazz and soul inspirations with a modernized style. Primarily a pop and R&B record, its first disc juxtaposes rhythm and blues with hip hop and urban elements with most songs employing samples, while the second contains all original tracks with the exception of "Candyman", which samples "Tarzan & Jane Swingin' on a Vine". Lyrically, the album is inspired by Aguilera's previous life events including her marriage with Jordan Bratman in 2005.

To portray a new persona, Aguilera adopted her new alter ego Baby Jane and made several changes to her public appearance, inspired by classic Hollywood actresses. She promoted the album by performing at events like the 2006 MTV Movie Awards, the 2006 MTV Video Music Awards and the 49th Annual Grammy Awards. It was further promoted with Back to Basics Tour, which visited countries in North America, Asia, Europe, Australia and Middle East from late 2006 until late 2008. Back to Basics spawned three international singles: "Ain't No Other Man", "Hurt" and "Candyman"; "Slow Down Baby" was only released as a single in Australia, while "Oh Mother" was only released as a single in several European countries.

Back to Basics received favorable reviews from music critics, who complimented its musical diversity from Aguilera's previous albums while there were others who criticized its length. The album received a Grammy Award nomination for Best Pop Vocal Album, and its lead single "Ain't No Other Man" won Best Female Pop Vocal Performance at the 49th Annual Grammy Awards (2007). It debuted at number one on the US Billboard 200 with first-week sales of 346,000 copies. Back to Basics achieved similar success internationally, reaching the top of the charts in over fifteen countries including Australia, Canada, Germany, Ireland, Switzerland and United Kingdom. The album has sold 1.7 million copies in the United States, and over 5 million worldwide, as of November 2013.

Background and development

At the 46th Annual Grammy Awards on February 8, 2004, Aguilera announced that she was going to work on a follow-up album to Stripped (2002). She stated her main idea for the project was to "evolve as an artist and a visionary", which was taken from a poem she wrote during The Stripped Tour (2003). In an interview with Billboard magazine, Aguilera expressed dissatisfaction with contemporary music, as technology "has advanced itself so anybody can be a singer". Thus, Aguilera took musical inspirations from old-school jazz, blues and soul records performed by her 1920s–1950s idols, including Billie Holiday, Otis Redding, Etta James and Ella Fitzgerald, which she viewed as "music that really had heart". The singer stated that her love for retro music was born when she was a child—her mother and grandmother took her to the old vinyl stores in Pittsburgh. According to Aguilera, Back to Basics was meant to pay "homage and utmost respect" to some of her favorite musicians.

Recording and production
To create a "throwback" with elements of old-school genres combined with "a modern-day twist", Aguilera sent letters to different producers that she hoped could help her with the direction she was taking for the project, encouraging them to experiment, reinvent and create a modern soul feel. She initially planned to condense the album into a single, more "affordable" disc, however, she expanded Back to Basics as a double album. For the first disc, Aguilera collaborated with hip hop producers including DJ Premier, Rich Harrison, Kwamé, and Mark Ronson for the first time. Most songs from the first half incorporate horn samples to create "gritty and old" sounds. DJ Premier questioned if Aguilera was familiar with his work, though she had known of his jazz-influenced work with Gang Starr in the late 1980s and early 1990s. In response, Aguilera wanted her album to draw inspirations from Premier's song "Jazz Thing" and noted that their collaboration became his first time "venturing into the 'pop' world". For the "1920s and 1930s-era vibe"-influenced second disc, Aguilera teamed up with longtime producer Linda Perry, who produced on Aguilera's previous album Stripped. In contrast to the first disc, the second one consists of all live recordings without using samples (with the exception of "Candyman" featuring a sample of "Tarzan & Jane Swingin' on a Vine").

Recording sessions of the project took place between 2005 and 2006 at various studios in the United States and the United Kingdom, including the Chalice Recording Studios and The Record Plant in Los Angeles, California. All songs from Back to Basics were recorded using Pro Tools HD3 program and done with a SSL J9000 console with ninety-six inputs. Aguilera's vocals were recorded using a Telefunken ELAM 251 microphone, possibly in conjunction with an Avalon M-5 pre-amp. Producer Scott Storch, who contributed to Aguilera's previous studio album Stripped, was asked to return for the production of Back to Basics. However, he refused the offer when Aguilera declined to pay airfare for him and his entourage to fly out to Los Angeles, which led to a breakdown of their relationship. Subsequently, Aguilera included the song "F.U.S.S." (an abbreviation to "Fuck You Scott Storch") on the album, which Storch viewed as "pathetic".

Aguilera also recorded a song about oral sex titled "Fuck You, Suck You" during a studio session with Linda Perry. It was supposedly meant for the Back to Basics album.

Music and lyrics
 
According to Aguilera and the production team, Back to Basics draws influences from 1920s–1940s jazz and soul music. However, music critics identified the record as a pop, and R&B album with similarities to 1960s, 1970s and 1980s albums. Dorian Lyskey writing for The Guardian thought that the album's concept "is so wide as to be meaningless", while Serene Dominic from Phoenix New Times compared Back to Basics musical style to rock band The Beatles' self-titled album (1968).

The first half disc incorporates strong elements from hip hop, urban, blending traditional and contemporary R&B. It features horn samples and gospel choirs, making it sound like "a dusty old vinyl album", according to Jenny Eliscu from Rolling Stone. Most songs from the disc employ samples, with the exception of "Without You", "Still Dirrty" and "F.U.S.S." "Makes Me Wanna Pray" featuring Steve Winwood features a gospel choir in its arrangement, while the pop/R&B and funk number "Ain't No Other Man" features "aerobic oomph" that is similar to Beyoncé's "Crazy in Love". "Understand" is an R&B ballad, featuring soul influences that are similar to ballads done by Gladys Knight, while "Slow Down Baby" blends traditional and contemporary R&B with hip hop and soul elements. The three follow-ups "Oh Mother", "On Our Way", and "Without You" are piano ballads. "Still Dirrty" was described as a "filthy... strut" with hip hop elements.

The second disc of Back to Basics opens with "Enter the Circus", described as a "carnival-creepy orchestration that sounds like Danny Elfman soundtracking Cabaret" by Tampa Bay Times, and followed by the soft rock-inspired "Welcome". "Candyman" draws inspirations from jazz, blues and swing, and was musically inspired by The Andrews Sisters' song "Boogie Woogie Bugle Boy" (1941). Similarly, "Nasty Naughty Boy" also contains elements of jazz and blues and features "blaring horn section" in its arrangement. On "I Got Trouble", Aguilera sings over a blues-inspired theme that is reminiscent of songs by Bessie Smith. "Mercy on Me" features gospel elements, while the acoustic track "Save Me from Myself" is inspired by country rock, different from other tracks on Back to Basics.

Most songs from Back to Basics were inspired by real-life events that Aguilera had experienced. The track "Oh Mother" talks about Aguilera's childhood with her abusive father; its lyrical theme was compared to Madonna's "Oh Father" (1989). Her marriage with Jordan Bratman was the main theme of the album, with tracks inspired by the event including "Makes Me Wanna Pray", "Ain't No Other Man", "On Our Way", "Without You", "Mercy on Me", "Save Me from Myself" and "The Right Man". On "The Right Man", Aguilera expresses that she has found "the right man" for her imagined daughter as she hopes that the child would not have to experience an abusive childhood like her, singing: "One day, My little girl will reach out her hand and she'll know I found the right man".

Aguilera expresses excitement toward old-school music on "Back in the Day", where she names classic artists including Etta James, Marvin Gaye, Coltrane and Aretha Franklin. "F.U.S.S." (which stands for "Fuck You Scott Storch"), is directed toward producer Scott Storch, who didn't accept Aguilera's offer to produce Back to Basics, containing lyrics such as: "Looks like I didn't need you / Still got the album out". In the lyrics of "Slow Down Baby", Aguilera tells a "lusty" man to leave her alone as she sings: "If you knew anything you'd realize I'm wearing a ring". "Still Dirrty" was described as a sequel to Aguilera's song "Dirrty" (2002), in which Aguilera sings about her "sexual independence": "Why is a woman's sexuality always under so much scrutiny / Why can't she do exactly as she please" and claims that she's "still got the nasty" in her. "Here to Stay" tells how Aguilera is "not just a flash in the pan pop starlet", while "Thank You (Dedication to Fans...)" features voice mails from Aguilera's fans, such as "You're so amazing" or "You inspired me to carry on living..."

Artwork and release 
For Back to Basics, Aguilera decided to portray her different image and persona from her previous stage name Xtina by adopting a new alter ego called Baby Jane, named after a character of the film What Ever Happened to Baby Jane? (1962). She also changed her public appearance as she removed her piercings, and dyed her hair platinum blonde, inspired by classic Hollywood movie stars such as Marilyn Monroe, Marlene Dietrich, Carole Lombard and Greta Garbo.

The album's cover artwork was taken by German photographer Ellen von Unwerth during three days; on the first and second days, the photos were shot at the Hollywood Dell hotel. Aguilera and von Unwerth moved to Forty Deuce in Hollywood to take images inspired by 1920s burlesque clubs on the last day of the session. The album's cover artwork was revealed in late June 2006, featuring Aguilera with bright red lipstick and curly blonde hair dressed in white and lounging on a bed. Greg Kot from The Baltimore Sun labelled the cover artwork as "a classy retro look, a sign that [Aguilera] is ready for her close-up as the leading lady of the teen brat pack that emerged in the late '90s". It also received criticism for being too similar to the artwork of Madonna's sixth studio album, Bedtime Stories (1994).

In mid-2006, Virgin Media reported that Back to Basics would be released on August 14, 2006. TMZ later reported that Back to Basics was planned to be released on August 15, 2006 in the United States. The album was leaked in full on August 3.

Promotion
 Live performances and tour 

Aguilera began her promotion of Back to Basics with a live performance of "Ain't No Other Man" at the 2006 MTV Movie Awards on June 8, 2006. On July 20, Aguilera held a forty-minute concert at Camden Palace Theatre in London, where she performed five songs from her then-upcoming album and two previous singles. On August 16, Aguilera held a release party for the album in New York City, New York. Aguilera performed "Hurt" at the 2006 MTV Video Music Awards on August 31. On September 8, she performed "Candyman" and "Bennie and the Jets" at the Fashion Rocks charity event; the latter was a duet with Elton John. Aguilera also sang "Ain't No Other Man", "Hurt" and "Steppin' Out with My Baby" with Tony Bennett on Saturday Night Live on November 11, 2006. "Hurt" was also sung on the NBC Christmas Thanksgiving Special in November, and the German television series Wetten, dass..? in December 2006. On December 31, 2006, Aguilera appeared on Dick Clark's New Year's Rockin' Eve and performed "Candyman" and "Fighter".

On February 10, 2007, Aguilera sang "Makes Me Wanna Pray" and "Candyman" at the Clive Davis' Pre-Grammy Awards Party. She also performed "Candyman" on The Tonight Show with Jay Leno. Between late 2006 and late 2008, Aguilera visited North America, Asia, Europe, Oceania and the Middle East during her Back to Basics Tour. It was promoted by the telecommunications companies Orange and Sony Ericsson. The eighty-one-show tour received positive reviews from critics, who complimented it as the strongest of her career. Grossing over $90 million worldwide, it became the ninth highest-grossing tour ever for a female artist and the most profitable world tour by a female artist in 2007. In February 2008, the live video album Back to Basics: Live and Down Under was released.

Singles
The first track from the album to be made available to the public was "Ain't No Other Man", which was released as the lead single to contemporary hit radio in the United States on June 6, 2006. Aguilera was featured in Pepsi's commercial advertisement, which used "Here to Stay", a track from Back to Basics as its main theme. Shot in multiple territories around the world, including Saudi Arabia, Prague, Rio de Janeiro, Tokyo, and India, the sixty-second advertisement premiered worldwide on July 14, 2006. Alongside the commercial, "Here to Stay" was made available for digital download on mobile phones as a promotional record to then-upcoming Back to Basics. "Hurt" and "Candyman" were serviced as the album's second and third international singles on September 17, 2006, and February 20, 2007, respectively. "Slow Down Baby" was released exclusively in Australia on July 28, 2007, while "Oh Mother" was released in several European countries in late 2007. In January 2008, Aguilera released a music video for the track "Save Me from Myself", following giving birth to her son Max Bratman.

Critical reception

On Metacritic, which assigns a normalized rating out of 100 to reviews from mainstream critics, Back to Basics received an average score of 69, which indicates "generally favorable reviews", based on 17 reviews. Stephen Thomas Erlewine from AllMusic appreciated the album's production, commenting that the project was "all the more impressive" coming after the "near career suicide of Stripped". Entertainment Weeklys Jody Rosen opined that Aguilera "can make her own glorious kind of 21st-century noise" and compared Aguilera's vocal ability on the album to that of Mariah Carey.  Mike Joseph of PopMatters felt that Aguilera "still shouts at times when a coo will do", but felt that her choice in collaborators made for an "ultimately rewarding listen". Sputnikmusic's Amanda Murray noted Back to Basics as another "transitional" and "innovative" record for Aguilera. Lucy Davies from BBC Music said that Aguilera has a "stunning voice", but stated that she could be more varied by cutting out some of the "y-e-e-eeeh, woah yeh's" on the second album.

Thomas Innskeep from Stylus Magazine preferred the first disc of the album over the "ridiculously overblown ballads" on the second disc, adding that Back to Basics was "one of 2006's best when Linda Perry's fingerprints aren't present". Similarly, Yahoo! Music's Dan Gennoe described the first disc as a "low-down and dirty masterpiece", but said the second disc found Aguilera "crashing straight back down again". Paul Flynn from The Observer provided a mixed review, saying that the beginning of the album was "all craft and very little heart"; however, he found the collaborations between her and Perry to be "deeply cinematic". Rolling Stones Jenny Eliscu opined that the release was "overindulgent and self-important", but would have been "masterful" had it been condensed into a single disc. Kelefa Sanneh from The New York Times gave a mixed review, stating that it "contains a roughly even number of great songs and lousy ones", and sait that "her homages to World War II-era pop music resemble skits more than songs". Sal Cinquemani of Slant Magazine criticized Aguilera for using a sexual image to overshadow her vocals, but commented that Back to Basics was more "cohesive" than Stripped. Robert Christgau provided a negative review, classifying the album as a "dud".

The album was also included in the book 1001 Albums You Must Hear Before You Die by Robert Dimery.

Retrospective reception
Various publications published articles about Back to Basics to celebrate its tenth anniversary of release, including Idolator and Fuse. In an article published on August 9, 2016, Katherine Barner of Idolator wrote that the album "put [Aguilera's] talent and musical diversity at the forefront" and that it "set Aguilera apart from her pop peers" such as Britney Spears, Pink, Janet Jackson, Christina Milian and Paris Hilton. On August 15, 2016, Jeff Benjamin of Fuse called Back to Basics Aguilera's "riskiest album", and stated: "While Aguilera shows the world who she truly was on Stripped, BTB appeared to be the first time Xtina got to truly create her own universe."

Accolades
Back to Basics received a nomination for a Grammy Award for Best Pop Vocal Album at the 49th Annual Grammy Awards (2007) and won Best Female Pop Vocal Performance for "Ain't No Other Man". At the 50th Annual Grammy Awards the following year, "Candyman" was nominated for Best Female Pop Vocal Performance. Back to Basics was named the best pop album of 2006 by iTunes. On June 17, 2008, Entertainment Weekly listed the album at number eighty of the hundred best albums of the last twenty-five years.

Commercial performance

Upon its release, Back to Basics reached number one in over fifteen countries, including the United States, the United Kingdom, and Australia. With 346,000 copies sold in its first week, the album debuted atop the US Billboard 200, being Aguilera's second number-one album after her self-titled debut album (1999) and her highest debut-week sales. It remained on the chart for forty-four weeks, falling off after a final position of number 164. The album was ranked at numbers fifty-nine and seventy-three on the Billboard 200 year-end charts in 2006 and 2007, respectively. Additionally, Back to Basics debuted at number two on the Top R&B/Hip-Hop Albums, spending forty-six weeks on the chart. The album went on to be certified double platinum by the Recording Industry Association of America (RIAA) for sales of two million units in the United States. As of 2014, it has sold 1,712,000 copies in the country. With first-week sales of 24,000, Back to Basics also debuted at number one on the Canadian Albums Chart. It was certified triple platinum in the country, selling over 300,000 copies.

Back to Basics achieved similar success in Europe, peaking at number one on the European Top 100 Albums. In the United Kingdom, it became Aguilera's first album to debut atop the UK Albums Chart. It charted for thirty-three weeks within the top seventy-five, and was eventually certified platinum in the country by the British Phonographic Industry (BPI). The album placed at numbers fifty-six and one-hundred-and-twenty-seven on the year-end UK Albums Chart in 2006 and 2007, respectively. In Finland, Back to Basics charted for eighteen weeks on the Suomen virallinen lista, peaking at number six. It debuted at number ten on the French Albums Chart, where it spent fifty-two weeks. The album proved be less successful in Portugal, where it peaked at number twenty-six and charted for two weeks.

The album achieved success in major markets in Oceania. It debuted at number one on the Australian Albums Chart and charted for forty weeks, while debuting at number two on the New Zealand Albums Chart and charting for twenty-seven weeks. The album reached numbers forty-five and thirty-four on Australian year-end charts in 2006 and 2007, respectively; while charting at number forty-three in New Zealand in 2007. Back to Basics went on the reach double platinum certification in the former and platinum in the latter.  Back to Basics debuted at number seven on the Oricon Albums Chart in Japan with first-week sales of 32,241 units. It was later certified gold by the Recording Industry Association of Japan (RIAJ) for shipments of 100,000 copies. According to RCA Records frontman Clive Davis, the album has sold approximately five million copies worldwide as of November 2013.

Track listing
Credits adapted from the liner notes of Back to Basics.Notes signifies an additional producer
 signifies a co-producer
 signifies a vocal producerSampling credits'''
 "Intro (Back to Basics)" contains a sample of "The Thrill Is Gone (Live)", as performed by B.B. King, The Crusaders and The Royal Philharmonic Orchestra.
 "Makes Me Wanna Pray" contains a sample from "Glad", as performed by Traffic.
 "Back in the Day" contains samples from "Charley", as performed by Don Costa Orchestra, and "Troglodyte", as performed by The Jimmy Castor Bunch. 
 "Ain't No Other Man" contains samples from "Happy Skippy Moon Strut", as performed by Moon People, and "The Cissy's Thang", as performed by The Soul Seven.
 "Understand" contains a sample from "Nearer to You", as performed by Betty Harris.
 "Slow Down Baby" contains samples from "Window Raisin' Granny", as performed by Gladys Knight & the Pips and "So Seductive", as performed by Tony Yayo.
 "Oh Mother" contains a sample from "Vois Sur Ton Chemin", written by Bruno Coulais and Christopher Barratler.
 "On Our Way" contains a sample from "Sentimentale", as performed by Claude Bolling.
 "Here to Stay" contains a sample from "The Best Thing You Ever Had", as performed by Candi Staton.
 "Thank You (Dedication to Fans...)" contains samples from "Can't Hold Us Down" and "Genie in a Bottle", as performed by Aguilera, and "Think Big", as performed by Pudgie the Fat Bastard featuring The Notorious B.I.G. The track also features fan club recordings by Shane Burrows, Jessica Cavanaugh, She-Tara Franklin, Michael Holmin, Warren Keller, Antoinette Litte, Gustavo Medina, Sarah Anne Moore, Joshua Pospisil, Cory Steale, Durant Searcy, Samantha Silver, Tammy Simpson and Shanna Nicole Wiles.
 "Candyman" contains a sample from "Tarzan & Jane Swingin' on a Vine" from Run to Cadence with U.S. Marines''.

Personnel
Credits adapted from AllMusic.

 Christina Aguilera – vocals, background vocals, songwriting, executive producer 
 Jim McMillen – trombone
 Chris Tedesco – trumpet, horn contractor
 Ray Herrmann – saxophone
 Glen Berger – saxophone
 Tracie Burton – vocal scratches 
 Kara DioGuardi – vocal scratches 
 DJ Premier – vocal scratches , management of production of sound, engineer
 Paul Ill – bass
 Rob Lewis – guitar, bass, vocal producer
 Linda Perry – piano, guitar, bass, mellotron, songwriting, engineer, art direction and design, management of production of sound
 Tony Reyes – bass, keyboards
 Mark Ronson – guitar, bass, keyboards
 Francis Senger – double bass
 Jason Torreano – double bass
 Bill Bottrell – guitar
 Eric Schermerhorn – guitar
 Jordan Laws – mixing assistant
 Brian Gardner – mastering
 Oscar Ramirez – engineer
 Charles Martin Roane – engineer
 Kristofer Kaufman – assistant engineer
 Alan Mason – assistant engineer
 Chris Wonzer – assistant engineer
 Kwamé – management of production of sound
 Rich Harrison – management of production of sound
 Mark Ronson – management of production of sound, engineer
 Big Tank – management of production of sound
 Q – management of production of sound
 Ellen von Unwerth – photography

Charts

Weekly charts

Year-end charts

Certifications and sales

Release history

Notes

References

Bibliography

External links
Back to Basics at Metacritic
Back to Basics at Discogs (list of releases)

2006 albums
Christina Aguilera albums
Albums produced by DJ Premier
Albums produced by Linda Perry
Albums produced by Mark Ronson
Albums produced by Rich Harrison
Albums recorded at Record Plant (Los Angeles)
RCA Records albums